Shi Chengsheng (born 4 March 1967) is a Chinese judoka. He competed in the men's lightweight event at the 1992 Summer Olympics.

References

1967 births
Living people
Chinese male judoka
Olympic judoka of China
Judoka at the 1992 Summer Olympics
Place of birth missing (living people)